"Don't Ask My Neighbors" is a song recorded by R&B group the Emotions released as a single in 1977 by Columbia Records. The single reached No. 7 on the Billboard Hot Soul Singles chart.

Overview
"Don't Ask My Neighbors" was composed by Skip Scarborough and produced by EWF bandleader Maurice White.

The single's b-side was a song called Love's What's Happenin'. Both songs came from The Emotions' 1977 album Rejoice.

Critical reception
Craig Lytle of Allmusic found that ""Don't Ask My Neighbor(s)," came on a mellower note."

Chart performance

References

1977 songs
1977 singles
The Emotions songs
Songs written by Skip Scarborough
Columbia Records singles
Song recordings produced by Maurice White